This is a list of the main career statistics of former professional tennis player Pam Shriver.

Major finals

Grand Slam finals

Singles: 1 (0 titles, 1 runner–up)

Doubles: 27 (21 titles, 6 runners-up)

Mixed doubles: 1 (1 title, 0 runners-up)

Olympics

Women's doubles: 1 (1 gold medal)

Year-End Championships finals

Doubles: 10 (10 titles, 0 runners-up)

Titles

Singles:48 (21–27)

Doubles (111)

Mixed doubles (1)
 1987: French Open (Emilio Sánchez)

Grand Slam performance timelines

Singles

Doubles

External links
 
 
 
 

Shriver, Pam